PAL-E may refer to:
 Phase Alternating Line PAL
 Professional Agile Leadership Essentials